Rako Raaxo is a District in the northeastern Bari region of Somalia. It is the center of the Rako District in the autonomous Puntland region. Rako Raaxo has a number of academic institutions. According to the Puntland Ministry of Education, there are 7 primary schools and 1 Secondary School in the Rako District. Among these are Qalwo,Qarar-soor,Uur-Jire, Duud-Hooyo, Adingari and Xumbays.

Notes

References
Rako Raaxo, Somalia

Populated places in Bari, Somalia